Saadia is a 1953 adventure film directed by Albert Lewin and starring Mel Ferrer and Cornel Wilde. Set in Morocco, and based on a novel by the French writer Francis D'Autheville, it tells of a love triangle.

Plot

Cast

 Cornel Wilde as Si Lahssen 
 Mel Ferrer as Henrik 
 Rita Gam as Saadia 
 Michel Simon as Bou Rezza 
 Cyril Cusack as Khadir 
 Wanda Rotha as Fatima 
 Marcel Poncin as Moha 
 Anthony Marlowe as Cpt. Sabert 
 Hélène Vallier as Zoubida 
 Mahjoub Ben Brahim as Ahmed 
 Jacques Dufilho as leader of bandits 
 Bernard Farrel as Lt. Camuzac 
 Richard Johnson as Lt. Girard 
 Peter Copley as Mokhazenis 
 Marne Maitland as horse dealer
 Harold Kasket as Sheikh of Inimert
 Peter Bull as village leader
 Eddie Leslie as a villager

Production
Filmed entirely in Morocco, Saadia is believed to have been the first Technicolor feature to have been filmed on location. The cinematographer Christopher Challis called it the most difficult production he had ever worked on. Lewin had pre-selected the sets on a pre-production tour of Morocco, however, unaware of the technical requirements of the large three-strip camera rig, interiors proved to be too small. Thus, there could be no long shots. Among his other eccentricities the film maker also had a horse transported more than a thousand miles to the set, but finding the tail too short, had fake ones made abroad and sent to the filming location.

Reception
According to MGM records the movie earned $580,000 in the US and Canada and $772,000 elsewhere, making a loss to the studio of $408,000.

References

External links

Saadie at Melferrer.com
Saadia at New York Times

1953 films
1953 adventure films
American adventure films
Films directed by Albert Lewin
Films scored by Bronisław Kaper
Films set in Morocco
Films shot in Morocco
Metro-Goldwyn-Mayer films
1950s English-language films
1950s American films